The Second World War was a global war that lasted from 1939 to 1945. 

The Second World War may also refer to:

 The Second World War (book series), 1948–1953 series by Winston Churchill
 The Second World War (book), 2012 book by Antony Beevor